Counties ( or ), also sometimes known as prefectures, are the first-level administrative subdivisions of Albania, replacing the earlier districts. Since 2000, there have been 12 counties. Since 2015, they have been divided into 61 municipalities and 373 administrative units.

History
Since its Declaration of Independence from the Ottoman Empire in 1912, Albania has reorganized its internal administration 21 times. The primary division until the year 2000 was into districts, whose number, size, and importance varied over time. They were organized into groups comprising 12 counties beginning in 1991.

The current status of the counties is based on the 1998 constitution and was carried out on 31 July 2000. The former districts were abolished entirely and replaced with urban municipalities and rural municipalities, which further oversaw villages in the countryside. This was revised in 2014, so that the 2015 local elections divided the counties into municipalities at the regional level and administrative units for local government.

List

See also 

 List of counties of Albania by population
 List of counties of Albania by population density
 List of counties of Albania by Gross Domestic Product 
 List of counties of Albania by Human Development Index

References 

 
Counties, Albania
Albania
Subdivisions of Albania